is a 1928 black and white Japanese silent film with benshi accompaniment directed by Teppei Yamaguchi. It is part of the Kurama Tengu series and features the battle between the title character, Kurama Tengu, and his impostor. The last scene, featuring sword fights of exhilarating speed, is one reason this series was very popular, especially with children.

Cast
 Kanjuro Arashi
 Reizaburo Yamamoto
 Takasaburo Nakamura
 Tokusho Arashi

See also
 Kurama Tengu (film)
 Kurama Tengu ōedo ihen

External links
Kurama tengu - Kyôfu jidai on Internet Movie Database

1928 films
Japanese black-and-white films
Japanese silent films
1920s Japanese films